Mordellistena lonai is a beetle in the genus Mordellistena of the family Mordellidae. It was described in 1949 by Franciscolo.

References

lonai
Beetles described in 1949
Endemic fauna of Albania